Giupponi is both a surname and a given name. Notable people with the name include:

Flavio Giupponi (born 1964), Italian cyclist
Matteo Giupponi (born 1988), Italian racewalker
Giupponi Franca, Brazilian racing driver

Italian-language surnames